The Listening Project is a programme broadcast on BBC Radio 4 between 2012 and 2022, introduced by Fi Glover. The programme was a joint project between BBC Radio 4, BBC Local Radio stations and the British Library, which records conversations between friends, colleagues or relatives with the aim to preserve voices and experiences from the United Kingdom to "build a unique picture of our lives today". Over one thousand recordings have been made as of 2020, and they will be archived by the British Library for preservation.

References

External links

2012 radio programme debuts
BBC Radio 4 programmes